The 1978–79 FA Trophy was the tenth season of the FA Trophy, and this was to be the last season in which the Northern Premier League, Southern League and Isthmian League would be Level 5 in the English Pyramid System.

Preliminary round

Ties

Replays

2nd replay

First qualifying round

Ties

Replays

2nd replays

3rd replay

Second qualifying round

Ties

Replays

Third qualifying round

Ties

Replays

2nd replay

1st round
The teams that given byes to this round are Altrincham, Southport, Scarborough, Matlock Town, Morecambe, Stafford Rangers, Weymouth, Bedford Town, Kettering Town, Boston United, Atherstone Town, Runcorn, Lancaster City, Enfield, Wycombe Wanderers, Dagenham, Tooting & Mitcham United, Leatherhead, Spennymoor United, Falmouth Town, Nuneaton Borough, Bangor City, Hendon, Slough Town, Winsford United, Crook Town, Bath City, Maidstone United, Worcester City, Marine, Blyth Spartans and Whitby Town.

Ties

Replays

2nd replays

2nd round

Ties

Replays

3rd round

Ties

Replays

2nd replay

4th round

Ties

Replays

Semi finals

First leg

Second leg

Final

References

General
 Football Club History Database: FA Trophy 1978-79

Specific

1978–79 domestic association football cups
League
1978-79